The Women's Centennial Congress was organized by Carrie Chapman Catt and held at the Astor Hotel on November 25-27, 1940, to celebrate a century of female progress.

History
The date chosen was 100 years after the first World Anti-Slavery Convention in London in 1840. That convention had been a gathering of abolitionists from around the world. The organisers were surprised when women were sent as delegates and the initial reaction was to deny them entry. Women including the female delegates were only allowed in under sufferance and they were forbidden from speaking or voting.  This event was, in time, the catalyst for later efforts in the suffrage movement, especially the Seneca Falls Convention.  At the Women's Centennial Congress, 100 successful women, most notably Eleanor Roosevelt, were selected to represent female progress in numerous fields, although Catt had failed to get Roosevelt to attend the conference. The 100 women chosen were all American, alive and doing jobs that would have been impossible for a woman to undertake in 1840.

A later commentator evaluated the conference as a media event.

100 Women included (not complete)

Politics
 Eleanor Roosevelt
 Frances Perkins
 Ruth Bryan Rohde US Ambassador
 Florence Harriman US Ambassador
 Mary Anderson
 Katherine Lenroot
 Nellie Tayloe Ross
 Louise Stanley (Home economics)
 Harriet Elliott
 Sarah Wambaugh
 Henrietta Additon
 Genevieve Earle
 Frieda S. Miller
 Mary Driscoll

Education
 Mary E. Wooley
 Aurelia Henry Reinhardt
 Virginia Gildersleeve
 Winifred Edgerton Merrill
 Mary W. Newson
 Olive Hazlett
 Anna Pell Wheeler
 Louise Pound
 Viola Florence Barnes
 Alice H. Lerch

Science
 Margaret Mead
 Frederica de Laguna
 Christina Lochman
 Marie Poland Fish
 Anne M. McGrath
 Florence R. Sabin
 Maud Slye
 Alice Catherine Evans
 Frances A. Hellebrandt
 Gladys A. Anslow
 Catherine Blodgett
 Constance L. Torrey
 Emma P. Carr
 Helen U. Keily
 Wanda Kirkbride Farr
 Margaret Clay Ferguson
 Ida Barney
 Annie Jump Cannon

Medicine (not complete)
 Alice Hamilton
 Josephine Bicknell
 Gladys Dick
 Katherine MacFarlane
 Martha Tracy
 Bertha Van Hoosen
 Sara Josephine Baker
 Justina Hill
 Ruth Morris Bakwin

Theology and Social Service (not complete)
 Georgia Harkness

Lawyers 
 Catherine Waugh McCullough
 Florence E. Allen
 Sara M. Soffel

Home Economics 
 Flora Rose
 Helen T. Parsons
 Mary I. Barber
 Millie Kalsem

Business
 Beatrice Fox Auerbach
 Dorothy Shaver
 Dorothy Anderson
 Teresa G. O'Brien
 Clara Scovil

Miscellaneous
 Rachel Crothers
 Margaret Webster
 Antonia Brico
 Juliana Force
 Beatrice Winsor
 Grace McGann Morley
 Belle J. Benchley
 Captain Rhoda J Milliken
 Sergeant Mary C Gainey
 Eleanor Hutzel

References

1940 in the United States
Feminism and history
Women's suffrage in the United States
1940 conferences
Lists of women
1940 in New York City
November 1940 events
Women in New York City